LegalBeagles is an organization that offers a forum-based website for consumers to share experiences and to assist one another in dealing with various consumer and financial issues. It also offers a legal comparison website.

History
LegalBeagles is an independent consumer rights and consumer law forum. It offers support, informal advice, and resources to its visitors, registered users, and VIP subscribers since May 2007.

The forum started as a help site for consumers wishing to reclaim bank charges just prior to the start of the Office of Fair Trading v Abbey National plc and Others (2009) and continued to campaign for fairness in consumer contracts.

In August 2014, LegalBeagles were involved in obtaining a County Court judgment against Lloyds Bank Plc for unfair terms. In October 2014 they were involved in The Grace & Anor v Blackhorse Court of Appeal ruling stating banks cannot impose a default on a person's credit file if the credit agreement in question has already been judged unenforceable.

Services

The forum assists consumers to defend County Court Claims as Litigants in Person, and in financial and contractual issues. LegalBeagles also campaigns for action on online scams. In addition, the forum encourages support for Employment and Family Law issues.

References

External links
Official website

Consumer organisations in the United Kingdom